Today's Farmer is an agricultural tabloid newspaper, published every other Tuesday, and serving approximately 18,000 rural households in the counties of Essex, Kent, Lambton, Middlesex and Elgin counties in Southwestern Ontario.

History
Today's Farmer was established in January 2008, an amalgamation of the Voice of the Farmer and Farm Market. The Voice of the Farmer was established in 1966 in Dresden, Ontario, while Farm Market was established in 1997 in Chatham.

Dean Mulharrem is publisher of Today's Farmer, while Peter Epp is the editor. Coincidentally, Epp was editor of Voice of the Farmer from 1986 until 1996, and helped launched Farm Market in March 1997.

See also
List of newspapers in Canada

External links
 The Today's Farmer Official Website

Postmedia Network publications
Newspapers published in Ontario
Publications established in 1966
1966 establishments in Ontario